Lake Sonoma 50 is a 50-mile ultra marathon race held near Healdsburg, California. The course circumnavigates the Warm Springs arm of Lake Sonoma on hiking trails. It takes place annually on the second Saturday in April. The race was first run in 2008. In recent years it has become one of the most highly competitive ultra marathons in the United States.

Registration 
Registration is limited to only 400 runners. As a result, entry into the race is determined by lottery.

Race and elevation profile  
The Lake Sonoma 50 has a 14 hour time limit, with the gun-time being 6:30am on the day of the race.

According to the official course website, 86% of the course is single track, 9% dirt roads, and the first 2.4 miles on a paved road. There are twelve creek crossings and around 10,500 ft of elevation gain throughout the race.

Aid stations 

Stocked with normal ultra aid station fare including GU energy gels and products. The race directors ask that participants limit their drop bag to the size of a small shoe box.

Race rules

Rules:
 No littering 
 Be nice
 Have Fun!

If a participant violates the no littering rule or is observed being rude or unsportsmanlike they will be disqualified from the race.

Furthermore, there is a zero tolerance policy regarding the use of performance-enhancing drugs.

No pacers are allowed during the duration of the race.

Western States Endurance Run Golden Ticket race 
The first two men and women finishers of the Lake Sonoma 50 mile race are rewarded a guaranteed entry into the Western States Endurance run. Because of this it is considered highly competitive in the ultra running community.

Results

Key:

References 

2008 establishments in California
Recurring sporting events established in 2008
Sports in Sonoma County, California
Ultramarathons in California